HD 37124 b is an extrasolar planet approximately 103 light-years away in the constellation of Taurus (the Bull). The planet was discovered in 1999 orbiting the star HD 37124. Based on its mass, it is most likely that this planet is a Jovian planet (like Jupiter).

References

External links
 
 

Taurus (constellation)
Exoplanets discovered in 1999
Exoplanets detected by radial velocity
Giant planets in the habitable zone